The 1984–85 Minnesota Strikers season of the Major Indoor Soccer League  was the first season of the new team in the indoor league, and part of the club's eighteenth season in professional soccer.  Previously, the club fielded an outdoor team in the North American Soccer League.   This year, the team finished fourth in the Eastern Division of the regular season.  They made it to the playoffs and were a Division Finalist.

Background

Review

Competitions

MISL regular season 

Playoff teams in bold.

Results summaries

Results by round

Match reports

MISL Playoffs

Wildcard Series

Quarterfinals

Semifinals

**San Diego won the shootout 4-3, but Minnesota appealed the result, as the Sockers used an ineligible player. The Strikers were declared winners on May 13.

Bracket

Match reports

Statistics

Transfers

References 

Minnesota Strikers seasons
Minnesota Strikers
Minnesota Strikers
Minnesota Strikers